trans was an annual, non-commercial arts festival held in Belfast, Northern Ireland, linked with the Urban Arts Academy and organised by the Belfast Waterfront Hall. Over a four-week period it hosted a programme of gigs, free seminars, courses, exhibitions and broadcasts its own radio station.

Ideology

trans stated a list of ideologies and beliefs:
 Investing in new technologies, new trends, new art forms and new artists.
 Providing training in career paths which the current system does not.
 Encouraging debate outside traditional politics
 Demonstrate that Urban Arts should not be confined to Youth Culture
To bring the world to Belfast, and Belfast to the world

History

The festival was originally set up in 2006, to complement the Urban Arts Academy. Its usual running dates are between the Orange Order's Orangefest and the West Belfast Feile an Phobail.

Throughout its five-year history, the festival was popular not only with the Urban Arts Academy students, but with music and arts lovers from all walks of life, and regularly attracts international artists and audience members.

In 2010 and 2011, the festival ran a spin-off winter festival Base, which was an international street art and music festival which in 2011 was headlined by Sleigh Bells and Ghostpoet.

Signature events

trans consists of signature events alongside its main events, two of which are the "Money Back Guarantee" and "The Lap-off"

Money-Back Guarantee is about breaking down the barrier between artist and performer, The festival organisers offer your money back at the end of the show, giving the audience a chance to pay each performer depending on how entertaining they were.

The Lap off Consists of eight laptop musicians battling it out in a competition based on their performance using electronic sampling and essentially the use of computers in music.

Departure of organisers

After various charges of conflicts of interest in March 2011, the staff left. The Waterfront Hall announced it would be rebuilding with a view to concentrating on conference business.

External links
2012 archive of discontinued trans site

Notes

Recurring events established in 2006
County Antrim
Arts festivals in Northern Ireland
Summer events in Northern Ireland
Festivals in Belfast